Bird tracking provides a way to assess the habitat range and behavior of birds without ever seeing the bird.  Bird tracking falls under the category of tracking and is related to animal tracking. A guide to bird tracking has been published.  Bird tracking is a tool used by naturalists to assess what birds are present in an ecosystem even if the bird is rarely seen.

Data collection
In the Pacific Northwest of the United States, a program called NatureMapping collects data by educating the public and having them pool their data in a citizen science application.  Data can be collected in the field using a handheld palm pilot and GPS system that streamlines the collection process.  This free program is called CyberTracker.  In order to make sure that data is reliable, a tracker evaluation system has been put in place through the CyberTracker organization.

References

External links
NatureMapping

Habitats
Wild animals identification
Bird hunting
Birdwatching